Luna E-6 No.8 (Ye-6 series), sometimes identified by NASA as Luna 1965A, was a Soviet spacecraft which was lost in a launch failure in 1965. It was a  Luna Ye-6 spacecraft, the seventh of twelve to be launched, It was intended to be the first spacecraft to perform a soft landing on the Moon, a goal which would eventually be accomplished by the final Ye-6 spacecraft, Luna 9.

Luna E-6 No.8 was launched on 10 April 1965, atop a Molniya-L 8K78L carrier rocket, flying from Site 1/5 at the Baikonur Cosmodrome. During third stage flight, a nitrogen pipeline in the oxidiser tank depressurised, which caused a loss of oxidiser flow to the engine and resulted in the engine cutting off. The spacecraft failed to achieve orbit, and the spacecraft disintegrated on reentry. Prior to the release of information about its mission, NASA correctly identified that it had been an attempt to land a spacecraft on the Moon.

References

External links

 Zarya - Luna programme chronology

Luna programme
Spacecraft launched in 1965